The Morocco Open or Rabat Grand Prix (for sponsorship reasons called the Grand Prix de SAR La Princesse Lalla Meryem), is a women's professional tennis tournament currently held in Rabat, Morocco. This WTA Tour event is classified as an International tournament and is played on outdoor clay courts.

Tímea Babos is the doubles record holder with three wins.
Patricia Wartusch, Émilie Loit, Iveta Benešová won both singles and doubles titles the same year.

History

The event started in July 2001 in Casablanca, Morocco. It stayed in that city until 2005, when it was moved to Rabat the first time. In 2007, the tournament changed location again, this time to Fez. In 2013 it was relocated to Marrakesh, before returning to Rabat in 2016.

The tournament is named after Princess Lalla Meryem, the sister of Mohammed VI, King of Morocco.

From 2005 through 2008, the tournament was a Tier IV event. Before 2005, it was a Tier V event.

Past finals

Singles

Doubles

See also
List of tennis tournaments
Grand Prix Hassan II

References

External links
Official website

 
Tennis tournaments in Morocco
Clay court tennis tournaments
WTA Tour
Recurring sporting events established in 2001
2001 establishments in Morocco